Outstanding supporting actor may refer one of several different awards, including:

 Daytime Emmy Award for Outstanding Supporting Actor in a Drama Series
 NAACP Image Award for Outstanding Supporting Actor in a Motion Picture
 Primetime Emmy Award for Outstanding Supporting Actor in a Comedy Series
 Primetime Emmy Award for Outstanding Supporting Actor in a Drama Series
 Primetime Emmy Award for Outstanding Supporting Actor in a Limited Series or Movie
 Screen Actors Guild Award for Outstanding Performance by a Male Actor in a Supporting Role

See also

 Supporting actor
 List of awards for supporting actor